The football tournament at the 1993 Southeast Asian Games was held from 7 to 19 June 1993 in Singapore.

Teams

Group stage

Group A

Group B

Knockout stage

Semi-finals

Bronze medal match

Gold medal match

Winners

Medal winners

References 
Morrison, Neil. "Southeast Asian Games 1993" RSSSF.
"SEA Games 1993". AFF official website.

Southeast
1993 in Singaporean sport
1993 Southeast Asian Games
Football at the Southeast Asian Games
1993
1993 in Singaporean football